Dörte Thümmler (born 29 October 1971) is a German former gymnast. She competed for the SC Dynamo Berlin / Sportvereinigung (SV) Dynamo, and competed for East Germany. She won many international competitions. In 1987, she was World Champion on the uneven bars (tied with Daniela Silivaș).

Competitive history

References

External links
Uneven Bars 1987 Tokyo
Uneven Bars 1988 Seoul
Vault 1988 Seoul
Balance Beam 1988 Seoul
Floor Exercise 1988 Seoul
Floor Exercise 1988 Seoul 2

1971 births
Living people
German female artistic gymnasts
World champion gymnasts
Medalists at the World Artistic Gymnastics Championships
Gymnasts from Berlin
Olympic gymnasts of East Germany
Gymnasts at the 1988 Summer Olympics
Olympic bronze medalists for East Germany
Olympic medalists in gymnastics
Medalists at the 1988 Summer Olympics
Recipients of the Patriotic Order of Merit
20th-century German women
21st-century German women